Ezekiel Gilman Robinson (March 23, 1815June 13, 1894) was an American Baptist clergyman, theologian and educator, born at Attleboro, Massachusetts, and educated at Brown University and at Newton Theological Institution. He preached at Norfolk, Virginia, and at Cambridge, Massachusetts, was professor of Hebrew and biblical interpretation in the Western Theological Seminary (Covington, Kentucky), and in 1849 accepted a call to a church in Cincinnati, Ohio. Three years later he was appointed professor of theology in Rochester Theological Seminary and in 1868 was made its president. From 1872 to 1889 he was president of Brown University, and from 1893 to his death he occupied the chair of ethics and apologetics at the University of Chicago. He edited the Christian Review from 1859 to 1864.

Presidency of Brown

Some of the highlights of his presidency at Brown include:
 Held the Chair of Moral Philosophy and Metaphysics
 Erection of the Robinson Library (1878); Slater Hall; Sayles Hall; and an addition to Rhode Island Hall
 College funds were increased
 Delivered the baccalaureate sermons
 He delivered a series of lectures on the History of Intellectual Philosophy and Metaphysical Science in Manning Hall
 Preached in pulpits across Providence

Selected works

See also

References

External links

1815 births
1894 deaths
American educational theorists
American theologians
Baptist ministers from the United States
Brown University alumni
People from Attleboro, Massachusetts
Presidents of Brown University
Colgate Rochester Crozer Divinity School faculty
19th-century American clergy